The 1997 season is the 44th year in Guangzhou Football Club's existence, their 30th season in the Chinese football league and the 4th season in the professional football league.

Squad

Transfers

Winter

 In

 Out

Summer

 In

 Out

Match results

Friendly matches

Jia-A League

FA Cup

References

Guangzhou F.C. seasons
Chinese football clubs 1997 season